Samfya District is located in Luapula Province, Zambia. The headquarters is at Samfya.

Most of Samfya District is lake, swamp of floodplain. It covers Lake Bangweulu and the Bangweulu swamps, except for the north-east corner which lies in Chilubi District of Northern Province. The only extensive dry land is along its western edge where it borders Milenge and Mansa districts. There are numerous inhabited islands in the lake and swamps, as well as peninsulas almost entirely surrounded by water, such as the Twingi Peninsula.

As of the 2000 Zambian Census, the district had a population of 163,609 people.

References

Districts of Luapula Province